Ave Maria (Hail Mary), Op. 3, by Louis Vierne is a sacred song, originally composed  for mezzo-soprano and organ.

History 
Vierne was the organist and choirmaster of. He composed Ave Maria . It was published by Julien Hamelle. The composition was transposed for other voice ranges, and transcribed for mixed choir. Both solo and choral versions were recorded.

Text 
The text in Latin is taken from the Ave Maria. The first part is a verse from the Annunciation, from the Gospel of Luke, while the second part is a prayer for Mary's intercession:

References

External links 
 
 

1890 compositions
Marian hymns
Compositions in B major
Compositions by Louis Vierne